Henry Phillips may refer to:

Henry Phillips (singer) (1801–1876), English singer
Henry F. Phillips (1890–1958), American businessman for which the Phillips-head screw and screwdriver is named
Henry Myer Phillips (1811–1884), U.S. Representative from Pennsylvania
Sir Henry Phillips (colonial administrator) (1914–2004), British colonial administrator in Nyasaland, later Malawi
Henry D. Phillips (1882–1955), American football player and Episcopal bishop
Henry Phillips (comedian) (born 1969), songwriter and humorist
Henry Phillips (horticulturist) (1779–1840), botanist, horticulturist and writer who worked in and around Brighton, England
Henry Phillips (cricketer) (1844–1919), English cricketer
Henry Wyndham Phillips (1820–1868), British portrait painter
H. D. Phillips (Henry Dominic Phillips, died 1892), British civil servant of the Indian civil service
Henry Phillips (Massachusetts politician) (died 1685), American colonial politician and businessman
Henry Phillips (clergyman), English clergyman who betrayed William Tyndale
Henry Phillips (weightlifter), Panamanian weightlifter
Henry Phillips (author) (1838–1895), Philadelphia numismatist and translator

See also
Harry Phillips (disambiguation)